LKS Igloopol Dębica is a Polish sports club  from Dębica, Subcarpathian Voivodeship, Poland.

History
LKS Igloopol was formed by the Agro-Industrial Combine "Igloopol" in 1978 in Dębica. The club rose through the league pyramid very quickly as the amount of investment in the club increased. The club had its greatest successes in the early 1990s when it played for two seasons (1990/1991 and 1991/1992) in the top division of Polish football. Currently the club plays in the District class of Dębica.

Fans
Igloopol have a small but fanatical fan-base, with the fanatics stand amassing between 30-250 fans usually. In the 2005/2006 winter break an ultras group Ultras Morsy '06 dedicated to creating match choreographies was created.

Apart from in Dębica itself, Igloopol have fans in Pustynia, Kozłów, Kędzierz, Żyraków, Wola Żyrakowska and even in Chicago.

The fans have friendly contacts with fans of Ruch Chorzów, mainly because their local arch-rivals Wisłoka have friendly relations with Górnik Zabrze. Wisłoka Dębica are the clubs fiercest rival, and the Dębica derby is one of the most hotly contested derbies in the country. Apart from Wisłoka and Górnik Zabrze, Siarka Tarnobrzeg (who also have good relations with Wisłoka) and Resovia Rzeszów are also considered rivals.

Honours
Quarter-final Polish Cup - 1984/1985
2 seasons in the Ekstraklasa - 1990/1991, 1991/1992
12th place Ekstraklasa - 1990/1991
8 seasons in the Second Division - 1983/1990, 1992/1993
Subcarpathian Regional Polish Cup Semi-Finals - 2012/2013
Junior Subcarpathian Champions - 2004/2005

References

External links
 Fan website
 Info about the club on the 90minut.pl webpage

Association football clubs established in 1978
1978 establishments in Poland
Dębica
Football clubs in Podkarpackie Voivodeship